The Kuki National Assembly (KNA) is a political party in the Indian state of Manipur. It was formed on 24 October 1946, by S. M. Zavun, to act as a pan-political organisation among the various Kuki people. It last won seats in the 1990 Manipur Legislative Assembly election, and after that slowly fizzled out. In the 2022 Manipur Legislative Assembly election, the party fielded candidates for 2 constituencies.

Electoral history

See also
Political parties in Manipur
Nagaland Nationalist Organisation
Kuki National Army
Kuki People's Alliance

References

External links
 

1946 establishments in India
Political parties established in 1946
Political parties in Manipur
Regionalist parties in India